Lower Caversham is an area of the former town of Caversham, in the English county of Berkshire (formerly Oxfordshire). Today this is itself a suburb of the larger town of Reading. Lower Caversham has no formal boundaries, but the name usually refers to that part of Caversham situated on lower ground to the east of central Caversham, close to the River Thames.

The area lies entirely within the Caversham ward of the borough of Reading. As a unitary authority, the borough is responsible for all aspects of local government within the area. Lower Caversham is within the Reading East parliamentary constituency.

Caversham Lock is situated on the south bank of the Thames, and is connected to Lower Caversham by a weir—popularly known as The Clappers— which carries a public footpath across the river. This path also provides access to View Island, now a public park. Upstream of the lock, Reading Bridge provides a direct road link between Reading town centre and Lower Caversham.

References

Suburbs of Reading, Berkshire